Geta is a municipality in the northern part of Åland, an autonomous territory of Finland.

Its neighboring municipalities are Finström, Hammarland and Saltvik. The municipality is unilingually Swedish.

See also
 Åland Islands Highway 4

References

Notes

External links

Municipality of Geta – Official website

Municipalities of Åland